The Southeastern Conference (SEC) is an American college athletic conference whose member institutions are located primarily in the South Central and Southeastern United States. Its fourteen members include the flagship public universities of ten states, three additional public land-grant universities, and one private research university. The conference is headquartered in Birmingham, Alabama. The SEC participates in the National Collegiate Athletic Association (NCAA) Division I in sports competitions; for football it is part of the Football Bowl Subdivision (FBS), formerly known as Division I-A.

Members of the SEC have won many national championships: 43 in football, 21 in basketball, 41 in indoor track, 42 in outdoor track, 24 in swimming, 20 in gymnastics, 13 in baseball (College World Series), and one in volleyball. In 1992, the SEC was the first NCAA Division I conference to hold a championship game (and award a subsequent title) for football and was one of the founding member conferences of the Bowl Championship Series (BCS). The current SEC commissioner is Greg Sankey, who has been the commissioner since 2015. The conference sponsors team championships in nine men's sports and twelve women's sports. The conference is successful financially, with high revenue distribution to its members. During the fiscal year 2014–15 an SEC record $455.8 million was generated, which was a sizable increase over the $292.8 million for the 2013–14, largely due to the revenue from the introduction of the SEC Network, a television network operated by the conference dedicated to SEC conference athletic events.

On July 27, 2021, the University of Oklahoma and the University of Texas at Austin (Texas) of the Big 12 Conference submitted formal requests to join the SEC. On July 29, 2021, the presidents and chancellors of the current 14 SEC schools voted unanimously to offer membership to both schools, with both schools officially accepting the invitation the next day. The Sooners and Longhorns possess the Big 12's top two highest-earning athletics programs, with the Longhorns earning the nation's largest revenue. The Sooners earn the nation's eighth-largest revenue, which would be fifth-highest in the SEC.

Member universities

Current members
The SEC consists of 14 member institutions located in the U.S. states of Alabama, Arkansas, Florida, Georgia, Kentucky, Louisiana, Mississippi, Missouri, South Carolina, Tennessee, and Texas. The SEC is divided into East and West Divisions, although the divisional alignment is not strictly geographic, with Missouri in the East Division while being farther west than several West Division schools, and Auburn in the West Division despite being located farther east than East Division schools Missouri and Vanderbilt. These divisional groupings are applied only in football, baseball, and women's soccer, for both scheduling and standings purposes. In football, the two division winners meet in the SEC Championship Game.

The SEC will eliminate its baseball divisions once Oklahoma and Texas join in 2024.

Since July 1, 2012, there are 14 members, with Vanderbilt being the only private institution.

Future members
On July 27, 2021, Oklahoma and Texas formally notified the SEC they were seeking "an invitation for membership" beginning July 1, 2025. On July 29, 2021, the presidents of the current 14 schools of the SEC voted unanimously to extend an offer of admission to Oklahoma and Texas. On July 30, 2021, both institutions' boards of regents unanimously voted to accept the invitation, effective for the 2025–26 academic year. On February 9, 2023, both institutions announced they would leave the Big 12 Conference for the SEC on July 1, 2024.

Former members
Three schools have left the SEC, all charter members:

The University of the South ("Sewanee") had been one of the preeminent programs in college football around the turn of the 20th century. However, after helping to establish the SEC in the early 1930s, it became clear that the small private institution's athletic teams could no longer compete with those from large state universities. Sewanee Tigers football squads never won a conference game, going 0–36 in league play over eight seasons while enjoying much more success against non-conference foes from comparably-sized institutions. As such, Sewanee opted to leave the SEC after the 1940 season and transitioned its athletic programs to the lower divisions of intercollegiate play. The school is currently a member of the Division III Southern Athletic Association.

Georgia Tech left the SEC in 1964 at the insistence of athletic director and head football coach Bobby Dodd, who had unsuccessfully proposed stricter conference regulation of football recruiting and scholarship limits and was particularly incensed by the practices of coach Bear Bryant at Alabama. Georgia Tech eventually joined another Southern Conference offshoot, the Atlantic Coast Conference, in 1978.

Tulane left the SEC in 1966. The Green Wave won three SEC football championships, the last in 1949. However, like Sewanee, the private institution eventually found it difficult to compete athletically against large state universities; the 1949 championship team was the last Tulane squad to post a winning record in SEC play. The school decided to leave the league in 1966 and considered dropping to lower levels of NCAA competition or even ending its football program altogether to focus on academics. However, Tulane opted to remain in Division I, and the Green Wave has competed in the American Athletic Conference since 2014.

History

Founding
The SEC was established December 8 and 9, 1932, in Knoxville, Tennessee, when the thirteen members of the large Southern Conference located west and south of the Appalachian Mountains left to form their own conference. Ten of the thirteen founding members have remained in the conference since its inception: the University of Alabama, Auburn University, the University of Florida, the University of Georgia, the University of Kentucky, Louisiana State University ("LSU"), the University of Mississippi ("Ole Miss"), Mississippi State University, the University of Tennessee, and Vanderbilt University ("Vandy").

Racial integration

White southerners committed to maintaining segregation created controversy preceding the 1956 Sugar Bowl, when the Pitt Panthers,  with African-American fullback Bobby Grier on the roster, met the Georgia Tech Yellow Jackets. White southern segregationists created controversy by claiming that Grier should be barred from the game due to his race, and whether Georgia Tech should even play at all due to Georgia's Governor Marvin Griffin's opposition to racial integration. After Griffin publicly sent a telegram to the state's Board of Regents requesting Georgia Tech not to engage in racially integrated events, Georgia Tech's president Blake R. Van Leer rejected the request and threatened to resign. The game went on as planned.

The 1959 Mississippi State men's basketball team, led by all-American Bailey Howell, finished its season 24–1, winning the conference title. They did not participate in the NCAA tournament as school and state officials would not permit the team to play against Black players from northern schools. Four years later, in 1963, Loyola, with four black starters, played Mississippi State in the "Game of Change".

It was not until 1966 that African Americans first participated in an SEC athletic contest, and the first black scholarship athletes did not play in the SEC until the 1967–68 school year.

The first African American to compete in the SEC was Stephen Martin, who walked on to the Tulane baseball team in that school's final SEC season of 1966. In August of that same year, Kentucky enrolled Nate Northington and Greg Page on football scholarships, and Vanderbilt enrolled Godfrey Dillard and Perry Wallace on basketball scholarships. At the time, the NCAA did not allow freshmen to compete on varsity teams, which meant that these pioneers could not play until 1967. Page died from complications of a spinal cord injury suffered during a football practice before ever playing a game, while Dillard suffered a career-altering injury before getting a chance to play for Vanderbilt's varsity and transferred to Eastern Michigan. The remaining two both played in the 1967–68 school year. Northington made his overall debut against Indiana on September 23, 1967 and his SEC debut against Ole Miss the following week on September 30 (the day after Page's death), while Wallace made his varsity debut later that year.

1990 expansion

In 1990, the SEC expanded from ten to twelve member universities with the addition of the Arkansas Razorbacks and the South Carolina Gamecocks. The two new members began SEC competition with the 1991–1992 basketball season.

At the same time, the SEC organized competition for some sports into two divisions. The Western Division comprised six of the seven member schools in the Central Time Zone, while the Eastern Division comprised the five member schools in the Eastern Time Zone plus Vanderbilt, which is in the Central Time Zone but was placed in the Eastern Division to preserve its rivalry with Tennessee. Initially, the divisional format was used in football, baseball, and men's basketball. The divisional format was dropped for men's basketball following the 2011–2012 season.

Following expansion, the SEC was the first conference to receive permission from the NCAA to sponsor an annual football championship game that did not count against NCAA limits on regular-season contests, featuring the winners of the conference's Eastern and Western divisions. The 1992 and 1993 championship games were held at Legion Field in Birmingham, and all championship games from 1994 onward have been held in Atlanta—first at the Georgia Dome until its closure and demolition after the 2016 season, and since 2017 at Mercedes-Benz Stadium.

2012 expansion

On September 25, 2011, the SEC Presidents and Chancellors, acting unanimously, announced that Texas A&M University would join the SEC effective July 1, 2012, to begin competition in nineteen of the twenty sports sponsored by the SEC during the 2012–13 academic year. On November 6, 2011, the SEC commissioner announced that the University of Missouri would also join the SEC on July 1, 2012. For football, Texas A&M was scheduled to compete in the Western Division, and Missouri in the Eastern Division. Texas A&M and Missouri both left the Big 12 Conference.

2024 expansion

On July 27, 2021, Oklahoma and Texas formally notified the SEC they were seeking "an invitation for membership" beginning at the latest July 1, 2025.  In a joint letter, which was made public, Texas president Jay Hartzell and Oklahoma president Joseph Harroz Jr. wrote, "We believe that there would be mutual benefit to the Universities on the one hand, and the SEC on the other hand, for the Universities to become members of the SEC." On July 29, 2021, the presidents of the current 14 schools of the SEC voted unanimously to extend an offer of admission to Oklahoma and Texas. The boards of regents for both institutions on July 30, 2021, accepted conference membership. On February 9, 2023, the Big 12 and the two schools announced they had reached a buyout agreement that will allow the schools to join the SEC in 2024.

Commissioners
The office of Commissioner was created in 1940.

Membership timeline

Academics and SECU

Formation of SECU and SEC academic network
In 2005, the member institutions of the Southeastern Conference formed the SEC Academic Consortium (SECAC), a collaborative endeavor designed to promote research, scholarship, and achievement amongst the universities.

In 2011, the SEC Academic Consortium was relocated to the SEC headquarters in Birmingham, Alabama, from its original home on the campus of the University of Arkansas in Fayetteville, Arkansas, and was renamed SECU. The SECU rebranded its mission to better serve as a means through which the collaborative academic endeavors and achievements of Southeastern Conference universities would be promoted and advanced. The SECU's goals included highlighting the endeavors and achievements of SEC faculty, students and its universities; advancing the academic reputation of SEC universities; identifying and preparing future leaders for high-level service in academia; increasing the amount and type of study abroad opportunities available for students; and providing opportunities for collaboration among SEC university personnel. The Big Ten Conference, since 1958, has had a similar program, now called the Big Ten Academic Alliance.

The SEC Symposium component of SECU was crafted by Vanderbilt University Chancellor Nicholas S. Zeppos, who at the time was the Vice President of the SEC Executive Committee and liaison to SECU. In an interview with Dr. Zeppos about the formation of the SECU he noted, "that the member institutions of the Southeastern Conference are committed to a shared mission of fostering research, scholarship, and achievement. The SEC Symposium represents a platform to connect, collaborate and promote a productive dialogue that will span disciplinary and institutional boundaries and allow us to work together for the betterment of society."

The SEC Academic Network was created in 2009 in partnership with ESPN. The SEC Academic Network was an online library of institutionally produced videos featuring academic initiatives and stories from all Southeastern Conference institutions. The SEC Academic Network was officially merged into the SECU operation.

Association of American Universities
Four current SEC institutions are members of the Association of American Universities: Florida, Missouri, Texas A&M and Vanderbilt. With the addition of Texas in 2024, the SEC will have five members.

Spending and revenue
Total revenue includes ticket sales, contributions and donations, rights/licensing, student fees, school funds, and all other sources including TV income, camp income, food, and novelties. Total expenses includes coaching/staff, scholarships, buildings/grounds, maintenance, utilities and rental fees, and all other costs including recruiting, team travel, equipment and uniforms, conference dues, and insurance costs.

Future members in gray.

Key personnel
Future members in gray.

Facilities
Future members in gray.

Apparel

* Oklahoma and Texas have accepted invitations to join the Southeastern Conference on July 1, 2024

Sports
The Southeastern Conference sponsors championship competition in nine men's and twelve women's NCAA sanctioned sports. Under SEC conference rules reflecting the large number of male scholarship participants in football and attempting to address gender equity concerns (see also Title IX), each member institution is required to provide two more women's varsity sports than men's. A similar rule was recently adopted by the NCAA for all of DivisionI.

Men's sponsored sports by school

Men's varsity sports not sponsored by the Southeastern Conference which are played by SEC schools (future members in gray):

Women's sponsored sports by school

Women's varsity sports not sponsored by the Southeastern Conference which are played by SEC schools (future members in gray):

 In addition to the above, Kentucky lists its coeducational cheerleading squad, its all-female dance team, and its team in the all-female cheerleading discipline of STUNT as varsity teams on its athletics website.

Current champions
 (RS) indicates regular-season champion
 (T) indicates tournament champion

Source: SECSports.com.

Football
 For the most recent season, see 2022 Southeastern Conference football season.

Scheduling
SEC teams did not play a uniform number of conference games until 1974. Prior to that, the number of conference games teams played ranged from four to eight, but most played a 6- or 7- game schedule. The league adopted a uniform 6-game schedule from 1974 to 1987, and added a seventh conference game from 1988 to 1991. Through this period and through the earlier years each SEC school had five permanent opponents, developing some traditional rivalries between schools, and the other games rotated around the other members of the conference.

After expansion to twelve programs in 1992, the SEC went to an 8-game conference schedule, with each team playing the five other teams in their division and three opponents from the other division. The winners of the two divisions would then meet in the SEC Championship Game.

From 1992 through 2002, each team had two permanent inter-divisional opponents, allowing many traditional rivalries from the pre-expansion era (such as Florida vs. Auburn, Kentucky vs. LSU, and Vanderbilt vs. Alabama) to continue. However, complaints from some league athletic directors about imbalance in the schedule (for instance, Auburn's two permanent opponents from the East were Florida and Georgia – two of the SEC's stronger football programs at the time – while Mississippi State played Kentucky and South Carolina every year) led to the SEC reducing the number of permanent inter-division opponents to one starting in the 2003 season. The TV networks televising SEC games were also pressuring for the change so attractive match-ups between non-traditional opponents would happen twice every five years instead of twice every eight years. With the subsequent expansion to 14 members in 2012, non-permanent cross-division opponents face each other in the regular season twice in a span of twelve years.

Under the current format, each school plays a total of eight conference games, consisting of the other six teams in its division, one school from the other division on a rotating basis, and one school from the other division that it plays each year. The permanent cross-division matchups are: Alabama–Tennessee; Arkansas–Missouri; Auburn–Georgia; LSU–Florida; Mississippi State–Kentucky; Ole Miss–Vanderbilt; Texas A&M–South Carolina.

The current scheduling arrangement was originally set to expire after the 2015 season, but the SEC presidents voted 10–4 in April 2014 to keep the current format for an additional six to eight seasons beyond 2015. Additionally, since 2016, SEC teams have been required to schedule at least one opponent each season from the other so-called "Power Five" conferences (ACC, Big Ten, Big 12, or Pac-12); games against select football independent schools also qualify, including Army, BYU, and Notre Dame.

All-time school records (ranked according to winning percentage)
Through end of the 2019 regular season including SEC Championship Game. Records reflect official NCAA results, including any forfeits or win vacating.

Notes:
 Alabama's record reflects 21 wins being vacated (2005–2007) and eight wins and one tie forfeited (1993).
 Mississippi State's record reflects 18 wins and one tie being forfeited (1975–1977).
 Ole Miss's record reflects 33 wins being vacated (2010–2016).
 Two former members have also won conference titles, Georgia Tech five and Tulane three.

Championship game

The SEC Championship Game pits the SEC West Division representative against the East Division representative in a game held after the regular season has been completed. The first two SEC Championship football games were held at Legion Field in Birmingham, Alabama. Since 1994, it has been played in Atlanta—first at the Georgia Dome through 2016, and since 2017 at its replacement, Mercedes-Benz Stadium, with the current hosting contract running through 2027. The "home team" designation alternates between the division champions, going to the East champion in even-numbered years and the West champion in odd-numbered years. As of 2022, the West leads 18-13 in overall wins in the championship game against the East.

Bowl games
The post-season bowl game tie-ins for the SEC for the 2014–2019 seasons are:

Payout is per team for the 2014 season; if different for opposing conference, payout for the SEC team is shown. Each conference member, irrespective of bowl participation, also receives an equal split of a payout to the SEC conference.

^ The Sugar Bowl is contractually obligated to select the SEC champion if that team is not participating in the College Football Playoff. In years where the champion is unavailable the Playoff Committee will assign another SEC team to participate in the Sugar. Alternatively, in years where the Sugar hosts a playoff game the SEC Champion will be sent to the Fiesta, Cotton, or Peach Bowl if not selected for the playoff.

† The Big Ten and SEC will be eligible to face the ACC representative in the Orange Bowl at least three out of the eight seasons that it does not host a semifinal for the Playoff over a 12-year span. Notre Dame may be chosen the other two years if eligible.

° In years when the Big Ten places a team in the Orange Bowl, the Citrus Bowl will select from ACC teams remaining after the Playoff Committee and Orange Bowl make their selections.

‡ The Big Ten and ACC will switch between the Music City and Gator bowls on alternating years.

¤ For the 2020 through 2025 seasons, the Big Ten and SEC will alternate which conference sends a team to the Duke's Mayo Bowl or the Las Vegas Bowl. SEC will be in the Las Vegas Bowl during the even years and Duke's Mayo Bowl during the odd years.

Head coach compensation
The total pay of head coaches includes university and non-university compensation including base salary, income from contracts, foundation supplements, bonuses and media and radio pay as of the 2021 season. As a private institution, Vanderbilt is not obligated to disclose salary information.

Player awards
Each year, the conference selects various individual awards. In 1994, the conference began honoring former players from each school annually with the SEC Football Legends program.

50th anniversary All-Time SEC Team
In 1982, the SEC Skywriters, a group of media covering the Southeastern Conference, selected members of their All-Time SEC Team for the first fifty years (1933–82) of the SEC.

Coach: Paul "Bear" Bryant

Offense
QB Archie Manning, Ole Miss 1968–70
HB Charley Trippi, Georgia 1942,45–46
HB Billy Cannon, LSU 1957–59
HB Herschel Walker, Georgia 1980–82
WR Don Hutson, Alabama 1932–34
WR Terry Beasley, Auburn 1969–71
TE Ozzie Newsome, Alabama 1974–77
OL John Hannah, Alabama 1970–72
OL Bruiser Kinard, Ole Miss 1935–37
OC Dwight Stephenson, Alabama 1977–79
OL Bob Suffridge, Tennessee 1938–40
OL Billy Neighbors, Alabama 1959–61
PK Fuad Reveiz, Tennessee 1981–84

 Defense
DL Doug Atkins, Tennessee 1950–52
DL Bill Stanfill, Georgia 1966–68
DL Jack Youngblood, Florida 1968–70
DL Lou Michaels, Kentucky 1955–57
DL Gaynell Tinsley, LSU 1934–36
LB Lee Roy Jordan, Alabama 1960–62
LB Jack Reynolds, Tennessee 1967–69
LB D. D. Lewis, Miss. State 1965–67
DB Tucker Frederickson, Auburn 1962–64
DB Jake Scott, Georgia 1967–68
DB Tommy Casanova, LSU 1969–71
DB Don McNeal, Alabama 1977–79
DB Jimmy Patton, Ole Miss 1953–55
P         Craig Colquitt, Tennessee         1975–77

Intra-conference football rivalries
The members of the SEC have longstanding rivalries with each other, especially on the football field. The following is a list of active rivalries in the Southeastern Conference with totals & records through the completion of the 2021 season.

Men's basketball
 For the current season, see 2022–23 Southeastern Conference men's basketball season.

Since the 2012–13 season, SEC teams have played an 18-game conference schedule, which includes two games (home and away) against each of three permanent rivals and single games against the remaining twelve teams in the conference. Men's basketball formerly used the East/West divisional alignment for regular-season scheduling and seeding the conference tournament, but it no longer does.

Before expansion to 14 teams, the conference schedule was 16 games. Although the divisions were eliminated beginning with the 2011–12 season, that season's schedule was still set according to the divisional alignments, with each team facing each team from its own division twice and each team from the opposite division once. As part of the proposal by SEC head coaches that led to the scrapping of the divisional structure, a task force of four coaches and four athletic directors was set to discuss future conference scheduling. At that time, options included a revamped 16-game schedule, an 18-game schedule, or a full double round-robin of 22 conference games. However, these discussions came before Texas A&M and Missouri were announced in late 2011 as incoming members for the 2012–13 season, which required a format that could support 14 teams rather than twelve.

At the 2012 SEC spring meetings, league athletic directors adopted an 18-game conference schedule. Each school had one permanent opponent that it played home and away every season, and faced four other opponents in a home-and-home series during a given season, and then the remaining teams one each (four home, four away). The permanent opponents were Alabama-Auburn, Arkansas-Missouri, Florida-Kentucky, Georgia-South Carolina, LSU-Texas A&M, Ole Miss-Mississippi State, and Tennessee-Vanderbilt. The home-and-home opponents, apart from the permanent opponent, rotated each season.

The 2014 SEC spring meetings saw a further change to the scheduling format. While the athletic directors voted to stay with an 18-game conference schedule, they increased the number of permanent opponents for each school from one to three. Each school retained its permanent opponent from the 2012–2014 period while adding two others.

From 1966 to 1967, following Tulane's departure, through 1990–91, the year prior to the addition of Arkansas and South Carolina, teams played a double round-robin, 18-game conference schedule. No team was undefeated in this period, though three teams went 17–1 (Kentucky in 1970 and 1986, LSU in 1981). During the period from 1992 to 2012 when the league slate was 16 games, Kentucky went undefeated in SEC play in 1996, 2003, and 2012 (although only the 2003 team went on to win the conference tournament).

Since the return to an 18-game conference schedule following the 2012 conference expansion, two teams have gone undefeated in SEC play: Florida in 2013–14 and Kentucky in 2014–15.

The scheduling format will change again with the arrival of Oklahoma and Texas in 2024. The conference schedule will remain at 18 games, but each team will play three opponents home and away—two permanent and one rotating. The remaining 12 games will be single games against all other conference members, evenly divided between home and away games.

Scheduling partners
The table below lists each school's permanent men's basketball-only scheduling partners from 2014–15 through 2023–24.

Basketball tournament

The SEC men's basketball tournament (also known simply as the SEC tournament) is the competition that determines the SEC's automatic bid to the NCAA men's basketball tournament. Notably, it does not determine the SEC conference champion in men's basketball—the conference has awarded its championship to the team(s) with the best regular-season record since the 1950–51 season. It is a single-elimination tournament and seeding is based on regular season records.

With the expansion to 14 members in 2012, the 2013 tournament was the first with a new format covering five days. The teams seeded eleven through fourteen play on the first day, with the winners advancing to play the No.5 and No.6 seeds on Thursday. The top four teams receive a "double bye" and do not play until the quarterfinals on Friday. The expansion to 16 teams in 2024 will result in two additional tournament games, but the top four teams will continue to receive "double byes" into the quarterfinals.

As of the current 2022–23 season, the tournament has most often been held at two venues that have each hosted twelve times. Louisville Gardens in Louisville, Kentucky, served as the regular host from 1941 until the tournament was discontinued after the 1952 edition. The Georgia Dome in Atlanta first hosted the tournament in 1995 and most recently hosted in 2014. Bridgestone Arena in Nashville, Tennessee, is now the regular host, with that venue hosting the tournament from 2015 through 2030, except in 2018 and 2022 (years in which it instead hosted the SEC women's basketball tournament). Sometimes, the tournament will take place at the Smoothie King Center in New Orleans, or Amalie Arena in Tampa, Florida. The 2018 tournament was held at Scottrade Center, now Enterprise Center, in St. Louis, Missouri, and the 2022 tournament was at Amalie Arena.

Prior to moving to the Georgia Dome, the tournament (during its modern, post-1979 era) was most often contested at the venue now known as Legacy Arena in Birmingham, Alabama, home of the SEC's headquarters and centrally located prior to the addition of Arkansas and South Carolina. Other sites to host include on-campus arenas at LSU, Tennessee and Vanderbilt; Rupp Arena in Lexington; and the Orlando Arena.

NCAA tournament champions, runners-up and locations
† denotes overtime games. Multiple †'s indicate more than one overtime.

Awards
The SEC Men's Basketball Player of the Year is awarded to the player who has proven himself, throughout the season, to be the most exceptional talent in the Southeastern Conference. Various other awards, such as the best tournament player in the SEC tournament and all conference honors are given out throughout the year.

Baseball

Schools play a 30-game league schedule (10 three-game series). Since 1996, schools have played all five schools within their division and five schools from the opposite division. Before the addition of Missouri and Texas A&M in advance of the 2013 season, schools missed only one opponent from the opposite division in a given season; each school now misses three opponents from the opposite division.

Since 1990, the SEC has become the most successful conference on the college baseball diamond. That year, Georgia captured the conference's first national championship at the Men's College World Series (MCWS). Following that, LSU won six of the next 19 titles, including five of ten between 1991 and 2000 and its sixth title in 2009. This was followed by South Carolina winning back-to-back titles in 2010 and 2011, Vanderbilt winning its first title in 2014, Florida winning its first title in 2017, Vanderbilt winning again in 2019, Mississippi State claiming its first title in 2021, and Ole Miss winning its first title in 2022. During that same span, 10 teams have also been runners-up at the MCWS. The MCWS final series has featured two SEC teams in 1997, 2011, 2017, and 2021, and the 2022 final involved a current member and a future member. The 2022 MCWS featured four current members, all from the SEC West, and both future members. The only current SEC member that has never appeared in the MCWS is Kentucky; every other current member has appeared at least 5 times. Among other current SEC members, only Missouri has not appeared in the MCWS while a member of the SEC (and has yet to make the NCAA tournament as an SEC member), although it made six MCWS appearances in the 1950s and 1960s while in the Big Eight Conference. Both Georgia Tech and Tulane have made appearances in the MCWS after leaving the SEC. Future SEC member Texas leads all schools in MCWS appearances with 38, and its 6 titles tie the Longhorns with LSU for the second-most championships. Another future member, Oklahoma, has two titles from 11 MCWS appearances.

SEC teams have also become leaders in total and average attendance over the years. In 2010 five of the top six drawing programs hailed from the SEC. Six more teams placed in the top 35 nationally.

The NCAA automatic berth is given to the winner of the SEC Baseball Tournament, which was first started in 1977. It is a double-elimination tournament and seeding is based on regular season records. Since 1998, the tournament has been held at Hoover Metropolitan Stadium in Hoover, Alabama and contested under the format used at the MCWS from 1988 through 2002, with two four-team brackets leading to a single championship game. The winner receives the conference's automatic bid to the NCAA Division I baseball tournament.

SEC presidents and athletic directors voted to expand the SEC Tournament to ten teams starting in 2012. The division winners received a bye on the first day of competition, and the tournament became single-elimination after the field is pared to four teams.

With the addition of Missouri and Texas A&M for the 2013 baseball season, the tournament was expanded to 12 teams. The top four seeds receive a bye on the first day, with seeds 5–12 playing single elimination. The tournament is double-elimination for the next three days, then reverts to single elimination when four teams are remaining.

The arrival of Oklahoma and Texas in 2024–25 will result in further changes to the conference schedule. The SEC schedule will remain at 30 games, but the divisional alignment will be scrapped. Each team will play 10 three-game series—two against permanent opponents, and eight against rotating opponents. The future format for the baseball tournament has yet to be determined.

In addition to the winner of the SEC Baseball Tournament, the Southeastern Conference usually gets several at-large bids to the NCAA tournament. Many teams have qualified for the NCAA tournament despite failing to win a game in the SEC Tournament. One of those, Mississippi State, went 0–2 in the 2007 SEC Tournament, but reached the MCWS in 2007.

Men's College World Series champions, runners-up and scores
Note: Teams in bold are current SEC members who advanced to the MCWS while in the conference. Teams in bold italics are current SEC members who were either in another conference or an independent at the time of their appearance. Teams in plain italics are future members.

Men's College World Series appearances
Future members in gray.

Rivalries

Several baseball rivalries have developed in the SEC:
 LSU–Tulane
Historically these schools were arch-rivals in all sports, but following Tulane's decades-long de-emphasis of sports, including its exit from the SEC in 1966, baseball is the only sport in which the two schools are relatively evenly matched. On several occasions match-ups between the two have drawn national record-setting attendances. Tulane reached its first College World Series in 2001 by defeating LSU in three games in the NCAA Super Regional. In 2002, the Tigers and Green Wave drew an NCAA regular season record crowd of 27,673 to the Louisiana Superdome.
 LSU–Mississippi State
Before the arrival of Skip Bertman as LSU's baseball coach in 1984, Mississippi State had long dominated the conference in baseball, with most of that success coming under coach Ron Polk, who returned to coach the Bulldogs in 2002 after retiring in 1997. When Bertman arrived in Baton Rouge, LSU's long-dormant program took off, winning eleven SEC championships and five College World Series championships between 1984 and 2001.
 South Carolina–Clemson
This instate rivalry is an intense local affair, with the Gamecocks and Tigers meeting each regular season, and has gained national prominence as both teams are often ranked in the top ten nationally. The highlights of the rivalry include the 2002 and 2010 meetings in the final four of the College World Series. Each time, South Carolina emerged from the losers bracket to beat Clemson twice and advance to the national championship series.
 South Carolina–North Carolina
The Gamecocks and Tar Heels met five times in the NCAA tournament between 2002 and 2013, including the 2002 NCAA Regional, 2003 NCAA Super Regional, 2004 NCAA Regional and 2013 NCAA Regional, with the Gamecocks holding a 3–2 edge.

Women's basketball
The SEC has historically been a strong conference in women's basketball. Since the 2009–10 season, teams have played a 16-game conference schedule with a single league table; prior to that time the conference schedule was 14 games, again in a single table. Like SEC men's basketball, women's basketball used the divisional alignment for scheduling purposes through the 2011–12 season; however, the women's scheduling format was significantly different from the men's. Each team played home-and-home games against five schools—one permanent opponent, two teams from the same division, and two teams from the opposite division; the non-permanent home-and-home opponents rotated every two years. The remaining games were single games against the six other schools in the conference, with three at home and three away.

The league voted to keep a 16-game league schedule even after the addition of Missouri and Texas A&M. Arkansas and LSU are no longer permanent opponents, with the Razorbacks picking up Missouri and the Lady Tigers picking up Texas A&M. The other permanent opponents are the same as men's basketball, except for Florida-Georgia and Kentucky-South Carolina (both pairs had been permanent women's basketball opponents before the 2012 expansion). Each school plays two others home-and-home during a given season and the other ten once each. The divisional alignments no longer play any role in scheduling.

The conference schedule will remain at 16 games after the 2024 arrival of Oklahoma and Texas. Each team will play home and away against one permanent opponent, with single games against all other teams, evenly divided between home and away games.

SEC women's basketball was historically dominated by Tennessee, who won regular-season and/or conference tournament championships in 25 seasons through 2015, as well as eight national championships since 1987. In more recent times, the dominant team has been South Carolina, winning seven regular-season and seven tournament titles since 2014, as well as national titles in 2017 and 2022. In the 28 seasons the NCAA Division I women's basketball tournament has been held, SEC schools have reached the Final Four 32 times, more than twice as often as any other conference.

Basketball tournament

The SEC women's basketball tournament is currently held a week before the men's basketball tournament. Like the men's version, it is a single-elimination tournament involving all conference members, with seeding based on regular season records. With the expansion to 14 schools, the bottom four teams in the conference standings play opening-round games, and the top four receive "double byes" into the quarterfinals. The winner earns the conference's automatic bid to the NCAA women's basketball tournament. Also paralleling the men's tournament, the women's tournament does not determine the SEC champion; that honor has been awarded based on regular-season record since the 1985–86 season. The expansion to 16 teams will result in the addition of two extra games, but the top four teams in the conference standings will continue to receive "double byes" into the quarterfinals.

The tournament, inaugurated in 1980, was originally held on campus sites; the first tournament to take place at a neutral site was in 1987. The three most frequent sites for the tournament have been McKenzie Arena in Chattanooga, Tennessee, (seven times), the Albany Civic Center in Albany, Georgia, (six times), and Bridgestone Arena in Nashville (also six times). However, the only one of these venues to have hosted the tournament in the 21st century is Bridgestone Arena. Because demand for women's tournament tickets is generally lower than for the men's tournament, it is typically played in a smaller venue than the men's tournament in the same season. The most frequent venues since 2000 have been Bridgestone Arena, Gas South Arena in Duluth, Georgia, (four), and Simmons Bank Arena in North Little Rock, Arkansas (four).

NCAA tournament champions, runners-up and locations
† denotes overtime games. Multiple †'s indicate more than one overtime.

Rivalries
 Tennessee–UConn

The Lady Vols have historically been one of the nation's dominant programs in that sport. Starting in the mid-1990s, UConn has emerged as Tennessee's main rival for national prominence. The Huskies won four national titles between 2000 and 2004; in three of those years, their opponent in the NCAA final was Tennessee. Connecticut also defeated Tennessee in the 1995 Championship game, the Huskies' first-ever title. The Naismith Memorial Basketball Hall of Fame brokered a deal that saw the teams renew their rivalry with a home-and-home series in 2020 and 2021, and both schools have since announced they will extend the series through at least 2023.

Other sports
Besides football, basketball, and baseball, there are a number of other sports in which the Southeastern Conference actively competes.

Rivalries
 Alabama–Georgia, women's gymnastics
These two storied programs have often butted heads for not only SEC titles, but NCAA titles as well. Georgia has won ten national championships to Alabama's six. For decades the rivalry was dominated by the two long standing coaches of the two schools, Suzanne Yoculan of Georgia and Sarah Patterson of Alabama. Yoculan and Patterson have since retired, bringing their personal rivalry to an end.
 Alabama–Florida, women's softball
These two nationally acclaimed softball programs have proven to be the elite of the SEC and the nation. While consistently being ranked in the nation's Top Ten, both teams find their way to the SEC Tournament Finals and often clash once more in the Women's College Softball World Series.
 Tennessee–LSU, women's softball
 Auburn–Texas, men's swimming and diving
One of the youngest rivalries featuring an SEC team, the Tigers and Texas Longhorns are the two most successful swimming and diving programs in the country. The two have combined for 17 NCAA National Titles since 1981 (nine for Texas, eight for Auburn) and between 1999 and 2007 won every national title awarded. The two regularly face off in a meet during the regular season, Auburn's men own a 12–9 record over the Longhorns. The women just recently began an annual series, with the Tigers winning the series so far 3–1. Texas was the only team to beat the Auburn men between 2001 and 2007.

National team championships

Since the SEC's founding in December 1932, the varsity athletic teams of its current 14 members have won over 200 national team sports championships.

The following is the list of the national team championships claimed by current SEC member schools, including those tournament championships currently or formerly sponsored by the National Collegiate Athletic Association (NCAA). The NCAA has never sponsored a tournament championship for major college football, the championship game for which is currently part of the College Football Playoff (CFP) system. Prior to 1992, championships for major college football were determined by a "consensus" of major polling services, including the Associated Press and United Press International college football polls. Recognized women's championships from 1972 to 1982 were administered by the Association for Intercollegiate Athletics for Women (AIAW), not the NCAA. There was a one-year overlap period during the 1981–82 school year, when both the AIAW and the NCAA operated women's championship tournaments; since 1982, only the NCAA has sponsored women's championship tournaments. National equestrian tournament championships are currently sponsored by the National Collegiate Equestrian Association (NCEA), not the NCAA. Those national championships dating from before 1933 predate the founding of the SEC in December 1932; championships won by Arkansas and South Carolina before the 1992–93 school year predate their membership in the SEC; championships won by Missouri and Texas A&M before the 2012–13 school year predate their membership in the SEC.

Football (40):
1919 – Texas A&M*
1925 – Alabama*
1926 – Alabama*
1927 – Texas A&M*
1930 – Alabama*
1934 – Alabama
1938 – Tennessee
1939 – Texas A&M*
1940 – Tennessee
1941 – Alabama
1942 – Georgia
1950 – Tennessee/Kentucky
1951 – Tennessee
1957 – Auburn
1958 – LSU
1959 – Ole Miss
1960 – Ole Miss
1961 – Alabama
1962 – Ole Miss
1964 – Arkansas*
1965 – Alabama
1967 – Tennessee
1973 – Alabama
1978 – Alabama
1979 – Alabama
1980 – Georgia
1992 – Alabama
1996 – Florida
1998 – Tennessee
2003 – LSU
2006 – Florida
2007 – LSU
2008 – Florida
2009 – Alabama
2010 – Auburn
2011 – Alabama
2012 – Alabama
2015 – Alabama
2017 – Alabama
2019 – LSU
2020 – Alabama
2021 – Georgia
2022 – Georgia

Baseball (15):
1954 – Missouri*
1990 – Georgia
1991 – LSU
1993 – LSU
1996 – LSU
1997 – LSU
2000 – LSU
2009 – LSU
2010 – South Carolina
2011 – South Carolina
2014 – Vanderbilt
2017 – Florida
2019 – Vanderbilt
2021 – Mississippi State
2022 – Ole Miss

Men's basketball (12):
1935 – LSU
1948 – Kentucky
1949 – Kentucky
1951 – Kentucky
1958 – Kentucky
1978 – Kentucky
1994 – Arkansas
1996 – Kentucky
1998 – Kentucky
2006 – Florida
2007 – Florida
2012 – Kentucky

Women's basketball (10):
1987 – Tennessee
1989 – Tennessee
1991 – Tennessee
1996 – Tennessee
1997 – Tennessee
1998 – Tennessee
2007 – Tennessee
2008 – Tennessee
2011 – Texas A&M*
2017 – South Carolina
2022 – South Carolina

Women's bowling (2):
2007 – Vanderbilt
2018 – Vanderbilt

Boxing (1):
1949 – LSU

Men's cross country (12):
1972 – Tennessee
1984 – Arkansas*
1986 – Arkansas*
1987 – Arkansas*
1990 – Arkansas*
1991 – Arkansas*
1992 – Arkansas
1993 – Arkansas
1995 – Arkansas
1998 – Arkansas
1999 – Arkansas
2000 – Arkansas

Women's cross country (1):
1988 – Kentucky

Women's equestrian (18):
2002 – Texas A&M*
2003 – Georgia
2004 – Georgia

2005 – South Carolina
2006 – Auburn
2007 – South Carolina
2008 – Georgia
2009 – Georgia
2010 – Georgia
2011 – Auburn
2012 – Texas A&M*
2013 – Auburn
2014 – Georgia
2015 – South Carolina
2016 – Auburn
2017 – Texas A&M
2018 – Auburn
2019 – Auburn

Men's golf (12):
1940 – LSU
1942 – LSU
1947 – LSU
1955 – LSU
1968 – Florida
1973 – Florida
1993 – Florida
1999 – Georgia
2001 – Florida
2005 – Georgia
2009 – Texas A&M*
2013 – Alabama
2014 – Alabama
2015 – LSU

Women's golf (5):
1985 – Florida
1986 – Florida
2001 – Georgia
2012 − Alabama
2021 − Ole Miss

Women's gymnastics (20):
1982 – Florida (AIAW)
1987 – Georgia
1988 – Alabama
1989 – Georgia
1991 – Alabama
1993 – Georgia
1996 – Alabama
1998 – Georgia
1999 – Georgia
2002 – Alabama
2005 – Georgia
2006 – Georgia
2007 – Georgia
2008 – Georgia
2009 – Georgia
2011 – Alabama
2012 – Alabama
2013 – Florida
2014 – Florida
2015 – Florida

Rifle (4):
2011 – Kentucky
2018 – Kentucky
2021 – Kentucky
2022 – Kentucky

Women's soccer (1):
1998 – Florida

Softball (6):
1982 – Texas A&M (AIAW)*
1983 – Texas A&M*
1987 – Texas A&M*
2012 – Alabama
2014 – Florida
2015 – Florida

Men's swimming (11):
1978 – Tennessee
1983 – Florida
1984 – Florida
1997 – Auburn
1999 – Auburn
2003 – Auburn
2004 – Auburn
2005 – Auburn
2006 – Auburn
2007 – Auburn
2009 – Auburn

Women's swimming (15):
1979 – Florida (AIAW)
1982 – Florida
1999 – Georgia
2000 – Georgia
2001 – Georgia
2002 – Auburn
2003 – Auburn
2004 – Auburn
2005 – Georgia
2006 – Auburn
2007 – Auburn
2010 – Florida
2013 – Georgia
2014 – Georgia
2016 – Georgia

Men's tennis (7):
1985 – Georgia
1987 – Georgia
1999 – Georgia
2001 – Georgia
2007 – Georgia
2008 – Georgia
2021 – Florida

Women's tennis (10):
1992 – Florida
1994 – Georgia
1996 – Florida
1998 – Florida
2000 – Georgia
2003 – Florida
2011 – Florida
2012 − Florida
2015 – Vanderbilt
2017 – Florida

Men's indoor track (29):
1965 – Missouri*
1984 – Arkansas*
1985 – Arkansas*
1986 – Arkansas*
1987 – Arkansas*
1988 – Arkansas*
1989 – Arkansas*
1990 – Arkansas*
1991 – Arkansas*
1992 – Arkansas*
1993 – Arkansas
1994 – Arkansas
1995 – Arkansas
1997 – Arkansas
1998 – Arkansas
1999 – Arkansas
2000 – Arkansas
2001 – LSU
2002 – Tennessee
2003 – Arkansas
2004 – LSU
2005 – Arkansas
2006 – Arkansas
2010 – Florida
2011 – Florida
2012 − Florida
2013 – Arkansas
2017 – Texas A&M
2018 – Florida
2019 – Florida
2023 - Arkansas

Women's indoor track (19):
1987 – LSU
1989 – LSU
1991 – LSU
1992 – Florida
1993 – LSU
1994 – LSU
1995 – LSU
1996 – LSU
1997 – LSU
2002 – LSU
2003 – LSU
2004 – LSU
2005 – Tennessee
2009 – Tennessee
2015 – Arkansas
2018 – Georgia
2019 – Arkansas
2021 – Arkansas
2022 – Florida
2023 - Arkansas

Men's outdoor track (24):
1933 – LSU
1974 – Tennessee
1985 – Arkansas*
1989 – LSU
1990 – LSU
1991 – Tennessee
1992 – Arkansas*
1993 – Arkansas
1994 – Arkansas
1995 – Arkansas
1996 – Arkansas
1997 – Arkansas
1998 – Arkansas
1999 – Arkansas
2001 – Tennessee
2002 – LSU
2003 – Arkansas
2009 – Texas A&M*
2010 – Texas A&M*
2011 – Texas A&M*
2012 − Florida
2013 − Florida / Texas A&M (tie)
2016 − Florida
2017 – Florida
2021 – LSU 
2022 – Florida

Women's outdoor track (22):
1981 – Tennessee (AIAW)
1987 – LSU
1988 – LSU
1989 – LSU
1990 – LSU
1991 – LSU
1992 – LSU
1993 – LSU
1994 – LSU
1995 – LSU
1996 – LSU
1997 – LSU
2000 – LSU
2002 – South Carolina
2003 – LSU
2006 – Auburn
2008 – LSU
2009 – Texas A&M*
2010 – Texas A&M*
2011 – Texas A&M*
2014 – Texas A&M
2016 – Arkansas
2019 – Arkansas
2022 – Florida

Women's volleyball (1):
2020 – Kentucky

* A championship marked by an asterisk (*) indicates that the institution was not a member of the SEC at the time of the championship.

National team titles claimed by current SEC institutions
The fourteen members of the Southeastern Conference claim over 200 national team championships in sports currently or formerly sponsored by conference members. The following totals include national team championships sponsored by the National Collegiate Athletic Association (NCAA) from 1906 to present, the Association for Intercollegiate Athletics for Women (AIAW) from 1972 to 1982, and, in football, the Bowl Alliance, Bowl Coalition, Bowl Championship Series (BCS) and College Football Playoff (CFP) since 1992, as well as consensus national championships determined by the major football polls prior to 1992.
 Arkansas – 50
 LSU – 48
 Florida – 41
 Georgia – 32
 Alabama – 28
 Tennessee – 22
 Auburn – 18
 Texas A&M – 16
 Kentucky – 14
 South Carolina – 5
 Vanderbilt – 5
 Ole Miss – 5
 Missouri – 2
 Mississippi State – 1

NCAA and AIAW national tournament team titles won by current SEC institutions
The following totals include national team tournament championships sponsored by the National Collegiate Athletic Association (NCAA) from 1906 to the present and the Association for Intercollegiate Athletics for Women (AIAW) from 1972 to 1982. The NCAA did not sponsor tournament championships in women's sports before the 1981–82 academic year, and the NCAA has never sponsored a national championship playoff or tournament in major college football. To date, the fourteen members of the SEC have won 216 NCAA and four AIAW championships, including:

 Arkansas – 48
 LSU – 45
 Florida – 38
 Georgia – 29
 Tennessee – 17
 Auburn – 14
 Kentucky – 13
 Texas A&M – 12
 Alabama – 10
 South Carolina – 5
 Vanderbilt – 5
 Missouri – 2
 Ole Miss – 2
 Mississippi State – 1

Broadcasting and media rights 
The SEC televises football games across various networks during the fall. SEC coverage is primarily provided by CBS and the ESPN family of networks, which includes ESPN, ESPN2, ESPNU, and ABC. Bally Sports also has rights to air seven live football games over the course of the season.

ESPN reported paying $2.25 billion for broadcast rights of SEC football games beginning in the 2009 season and running through fiscal year 2025.

Games scheduled for airing are generally picked two weeks before they occur, with a few matches that are selected by CBS and ESPN prior to the season.

CBS has the first pick for a game and selects the highest-profile game to broadcast to a national, over-the-air audience. The CBS game is usually broadcast at 3:30 Eastern. Some weekends, CBS will air a doubleheader of SEC games. CBS also has the rights for the SEC Championship Game.

ESPN will air several SEC games each week among its various channels, with Saturday time slots generally at 12:00 ET, 7:00 ET, and 7:45 ET, and some SEC games will be shown on Thursday nights. In previous years, Raycom Sports (and before it, Jefferson-Pilot/Lincoln Financial Sports) syndicated regional coverage for an SEC game of the week at 12:30 ET, but the new contract replaced it with a new ESPN-produced syndication package, the SEC Networkwhose football games kickoff at 12:21 ET.

Games on Bally Sports usually kickoff at 7:00 p.m. ET.

For games not selected by any broadcast provider, certain schools have the option of placing their games on pay-per-view, but with the conference's primacy nearly guaranteeing all football games are broadcast, the launch of ESPN+ and the inclusion of a second alternate SEC Network channel, along with the decline of pay-per-view on most providers outside ring sports, these games are usually broadcast by them instead.

All SEC schools broadcast their radio play-by-play through Sirius XM, and the conference carries its own full-time radio network on satellite channel 374, and via Sirius XM Online. If an SEC team is in the College Football Playoff, the team's play-by-play is often carried on an ESPN network or ESPN+ stream as part of its ESPN Megacast with supporting team-centric statistics.

2008 television contract
During the 2007–2008 fiscal year review meeting, there was discussion among SEC leadership about the possibility of starting a TV network dedicated to its conference, much in the same way the Mountain West Conference and Big Ten Conference have done with the mtn. and Big Ten Networks, respectively. A decision was made to postpone the decision until at least the following year.

In August 2008, the SEC announced an unprecedented 15-year television contract with CBS worth an estimated $55 million a year. This continues the relationship the SEC already has with CBS, which puts the SEC in the unique position as the only conference to have its own exclusive national television network of the four major over-the-air broadcast networks (CBS, NBC, ABC, Fox) to display the SEC's events.

In the same month, the league also announced another landmark television contract with ESPN worth $2.25 billion or $150 million a year for the life of the contract, which is for fifteen years. It is the longest and wealthiest contract among all television deals among the major conferences. With these contracts, the SEC had, at the time of the deal, the richest television deals in the country outside the Big Ten and helped make the SEC one of the most nationally televised and visible conferences in the country with the coverage that was provided by these contracts.

2014 SEC Network launch

The SEC Network is a television and multimedia network that features exclusively Southeastern Conference content through a partnership between ESPN and the SEC. The network launched on August 14, 2014, with the first live football game scheduled for two weeks later between Texas A&M and South Carolina on Thursday, August 28 in Columbia, South Carolina.

The network is part of a deal between the Southeastern Conference and ESPN which is a 20-year agreement, beginning in August 2014 and running through 2034. The agreement served to create and operate a new multiplatform television network and accompanying digital platform in the hope of increasing revenue for member institutions and expanding the reach of the Southeastern Conference.

Conference champions

The Southeastern Conference sponsors nine men's sports and twelve women's sports, and awards a conference championship in every one of them.

See also
 List of American collegiate athletic stadiums and arenas
 List of NCAA conferences
 List of SEC men's basketball tournament locations
 SEC on CBS
 Southeastern Conference Academic Consortium, located in Fayetteville, Arkansas
SEC Community Service Team
 Southeastern Collegiate Rugby Conference
 College Hockey South, formerly known as the South Eastern Collegiate Hockey Conference (SECHC) - a non-varsity ice hockey conference featuring many SEC schools

References

External links
 

 
Organizations based in Birmingham, Alabama
Sports organizations established in 1932
Sports in the Southern United States
College sports in Alabama
College sports in Arkansas
College sports in Florida
College sports in Georgia (U.S. state)
College sports in Kentucky
College sports in Louisiana
College sports in Mississippi
College sports in Missouri
College sports in South Carolina
College sports in Tennessee
College sports in Texas
Articles which contain graphical timelines